George Vater Pearce (1863 – 2 June 1935) was a New Zealand politician of the Reform Party.

He represented the Patea electorate in Parliament from 1908 to 1919, when he was defeated. In 1935, he was awarded the King George V Silver Jubilee Medal.

He was born in Devon in 1863, and emigrated to New Zealand in 1875 or 1878. He was a farmer and a noted breeder of Leicester and Lincoln sheep. He was chairman of the Patea County Council for 13 years. He was a rugby player and mile runner. He died in Waitotara near Wanganui.

He was the great-grandfather of a National Party Minister of Finance, Ruth Richardson.

External links

References

1863 births
1935 deaths
Reform Party (New Zealand) MPs
Members of the New Zealand House of Representatives
New Zealand MPs for North Island electorates
English emigrants to New Zealand
New Zealand farmers
20th-century New Zealand politicians